The 2021–22 Belgian Division 3 was the sixth season of the division in its current format, placed at the fifth-tier of football in Belgium. As the previous season was cancelled in January 2021 due to governmental measures against COVID-19 prohibiting amateur football, the division features nearly exactly the same teams.

The division consists of four separate leagues. Leagues VFV A and VFV B consist of teams with a license from the Voetbalfederatie Vlaanderen (VFV, the Flemish/Dutch speaking wing of the Belgian FA), while the leagues ACFF A and ACFF B contain teams with a license from the Association des Clubs Francophones de Football (ACFF, the French-speaking wing of the RBFA). The champions from each of the four leagues will be promoted to the 2022–23 Belgian Division 2.

Team changes

In
No new clubs entered as the previous season was cancelled.

Out
 Stade Brainois merged with AFC Tubize to become Royale Union Tubize-Braine, known as Tubize-Braine. As AFC Tubize was playing at a higher level (Belgian Division 2), the new club continued at this level, thus vacating the place of Stade Brainois in the Belgian Division 3.

Mergers
 Bambrugge merged with neighbours Mere (which was playing at a lower level) to become Erpe-Mere United.

Belgian Division 3 VFV A

League table

Belgian Division 3 VFV B

League table

Belgian Division 3 ACFF A

League table

Belgian Division 3 ACFF B

League table

Championship matches
Both the two VFV and two ACFF teams winning their leagues can arrange a title match to determine the overall VFV and ACFF champions of the Belgian Division 3. This season, the overall ACFF champion was decided in a single match, with Namur FLV winning the title. On VFV side, Oostkamp and Racing Mechelen decided not to play a championship match. There was hence also no match between the overall VFV and ACFF champions.

Championship match ACFF

Namur FLV was awarded the symbolic title of Belgian Division 3 ACFF champion.

Promotion play-offs

Promotion play-offs VFV
The teams finishing in second place in the Belgian Division 3 VFV A and Belgian Division 3 VFV B take part in a promotion playoff first round together with three period winners from these both divisions. These 8 teams from the VFV play the first round of a promotion-playoff, with the four winners promoted to the 2022–23 Belgian Division 2. Losing teams will continue in rounds 2 and 3 in case extra places open up.

In division A, champions Oostkamp won all periods, meaning that in theory the teams in place 2 through 5 would qualify. 5th placed Lochristi opted however to stop playing at this level and did not take part, allowing Erpe-Mere United to take part.

In division B, second place finishers Esperanza Pelt were joined by Lille United (4th) who had won a period title. The remaining spots were taken by the highest finishers not already qualified, 3rd place Diest and 5th place Turnhout.

VFV Round 1

Erpe-Mere United, Lebbeke, Turnhout and Lille were promoted. The losing teams qualified for the Promotion play-offs VFV Round 2.

VFV Round 2

Overijse and Torhout qualified for the promotion play-offs VFV Round 3. Pelt and Diest were eliminated and remain in the Belgian Division 3.

VFV Round 3

Torhout also achieved promotion through winning Round 3. Overijse was first in line in case another spot would open up.

Promotion play-offs ACFF
The teams finishing in second place in the Belgian Division 3 ACFF A and Belgian Division 3 ACFF B take part in a promotion playoff first round together with three period winners from these both divisions. These eight teams would play-off for one single promotion place up for grabs. 

In Division 3 ACFF A, Manageoise, as team finishing in second place in the Belgian Division 2 ACFF A qualified for the Promotion play-offs ACFF, as well as Binche (6th overall) for winning the first period. The two other periods were won by champions Union Namur-Fosses and hence 3rd and 4th placed teams Crossing Schaerbeek and Aische were invited as well. 

The teams in positions 2 through 5 qualified from the Division 3 ACFF B as no team outside the top five had managed to win a period title. Hence, Rochefort, Raeren-Eynatten, Herstal and Sprimont took part.

ACFF Round 1

Binche, Sprimont, Manageoise and Crossing Schaerbeek qualified for ACFF Round 2, the other teams are eliminated and remain in the Belgian Division 3.

ACFF Round 2

Sprimont qualified for ACFF Round 3, Manageoise was eliminated. The match between Crossing Schaerbeek and Binche was stopped due to supporter violence, after the match had ended 0–0 after extra time and teams were tied 4–4 during the penalty shootout. While both teams' supporters were taking part in the fight, the home team was penalized with a 0–5 forfeit loss for not taking sufficient safety precautions, allowing supporters of both teams to come together in the same stand during the penalty shootouts, eventually also leading to a pitch invasion. Binche therebye progressed to the ACFF Round 3, Crossing Schaerbeek was eliminated.

ACFF Round 3

Binche is promoted to the Belgian First Division 2, Sprimont is first in line in case another spot opens up.

Relegation play-offs

ACFF

Prior to the match, it was known that the winner of this ACFF play-off would avoid relegation, while the loser would need to await the results of higher divisions. Huy was thus spared while Gosselies was unsure.

VFV

Prior to the match, it was known that the winner of this VFV play-off would avoid relegation, while the loser would need to await the results of higher divisions. Witgoor Dessel was thus spared while Eppegem was unsure.

Number of teams by provinces

References

Belgian Third Amateur Division
Bel
5